The EFREI (École d'ingénieur généraliste en informatique et technologies du numérique) (Engineering School of Information and Digital Technologies) is a French private engineering school located in Villejuif, Île-de-France, at the south of Paris. Its courses, specializing in computer science and management, are taught with support from the state. Students who graduate earn an engineering degree accredited by the CTI (national commission for engineering degree accreditation). The degree is equivalent to a master's degree in the European higher education area. Today, there are more than 6,500 EFREI graduates working in companies dealing with many different activities: education, human resources development, business/marketing, company management, legal advice and so on.

History

EFREI was founded in 1936 as the École Française de Radioélectricité (EFR). The school's facilities were located at 10, Rue Amyot in the 5th arrondissement of Paris.

In 1945 an agreement with the government allowed students to receive financial assistance for the first time.
In 1947 an engineering department was created and in 1957 the EFR qualification was certified by the commission for engineering qualifications.  The teaching of computer science was introduced in 1969 and networking also became part of the syllabus.  In 1987, a second site in Villejuif was opened; student numbers increased from 70 to 160. More extension projects have taken place since, and in September 2001, EFREI was moved, the entire campus being situated at 30, Avenue de la République, Villejuif. The faculty of Information Technology and Systems Management numbered more than 300 students for the first time.

In 2003 its curriculum was made compliant with the Bologna process and is now delivering a degree that is equivalent to a master's degree in the European higher education area. The same year the school stopped renting the building in Rue Amyot; all classes take now place at the Villejuif site.  The college became briefly known as the College for Engineering, Information Technology and Business Studies but the name change was reversed in 2008.

Notable alumni
EFREI's most notable alumnus is André Truong who created the Micral, the earliest commercial personal computer based on a microprocessor.  In France, he is referred to as the father of the personal computer.

Pol Pot attended but failed his exams.

See also 
Grandes écoles

References

External links
 Official Website of EFREI
 EFREI Students clubs websites
 EFREI alumni website

Engineering universities and colleges in France
Grandes écoles
Educational institutions established in 1936
Villejuif
1936 establishments in France